Morton Garden Village railway station is a proposed railway station in Bassetlaw District, Nottinghamshire, England, near the A1 and A57 junction and the site of the former Checker House railway station.

The station would be on the Sheffield–Lincoln line, an existing line between Lincoln and Sheffield that now has hourly passenger train service.

Notes

References

External links

Railway stations in Nottinghamshire
Bassetlaw District